Ma'ale Mikhmas is an Israeli settlement in the Binyamin region of the northern West Bank. Located a few miles northeast of Jerusalem, it falls under the municipal jurisdiction of Mateh Binyamin Regional Council and according to Palestinians the Ramallah and al-Bireh Governorate.

The international community considers Israeli settlements in the West Bank illegal under international law, but the Israeli government disputes this.

History
Israel confiscated 1287 dunums of land from the Palestinian town of Deir Dibwan in order to construct Ma'ale Mikhmas.

Ma'ale Mikhmas was founded in 1981 along the Allon Road by a group of families from Ma'ale Adumim. It is named after the biblical Michmas.

The population of Ma'ale Mikhmas is evenly divided between native-born Israelis and immigrants from English-speaking countries, South America, France and Ethiopia. It defines itself as religious.

Notable residents
 Otniel Schneller (b. 1952), politician

References

External links
Ma'ale Michmas website
Michmas and Almonds in the Bible
Fighting the Philistines: Settlers of Ma’ale Michmas feel at home on a Biblical (and modern) battleground

Religious Israeli settlements
Mateh Binyamin Regional Council
Populated places established in 1981
1981 establishments in the Israeli Military Governorate
Community settlements
Israeli settlements in the West Bank